Bassac Abbey is a former Benedictine monastery in Bassac, Charente, France, in the former diocese of Saintes. 

The abbey was founded in 1002 by Wardrade Lorichès, count of la Marche and first known Lord of Jarnac, and his wife Rixendis on their return from a pilgrimage to Rome. Both were later buried in the abbey church), which was consecrated in around 1015 by Grimoard, Bishop of Angoulême, and his brother Iso, Bishop of Saintes. In 1095 the abbey was made subordinate to the abbey of Saint-Jean-d'Angély by Pope Urban II but regained its independence in 1246. Bassac Abbey was largely reconstructed under Guillaume de Vibrac, abbot from 1247 to 1286.

It was suppressed in 1791 during the French Revolution. The buildings were sold off as biens nationaux ("state property") except for the church, which became the parish church.

From 1947 to 2012 the surviving buildings were occupied and partly restored by the Congrégation des frères missionnaires de Sainte-Thérèse de l’Enfant Jésus. The site was sold in 2015 to a trust ("") for renovation as a "cultural and spiritual space of international dimensions" ("").

See also
 Plantagenet style

Resources

External links

1002 establishments in Europe
1000s establishments in France
Double monasteries
Benedictine monasteries in France
Christian monasteries established in the 11th century